RET or Ret may refer to:

People 
 Ret Chhon (born 1940), former Cambodian cyclist
 Ret Chol (died 2004), Southern Sudanese politician
 Ret Turner (1929–2016), American costume designer

Engineering and computer science 
 Renewable energy target
 Renewable energy technology
 Resolution enhancement technology, image processing technology used to manipulate dot characteristics
 ret, return from subroutine instruction in the x86 assembly language
 Registered Engineering Technologist, former certification in Alberta, Canada
 Rehabilitation engineering technologist, a role in rehabilitation engineering
 Ret, a measurement of the resistance to evaporative heat loss

Transportation 
 Retford railway station, by the British National Rail code RET
 Rotterdamse Elektrische Tram, the main public transport operator of Rotterdam, the Netherlands
 Røst Airport, Norway (IATA code)

Biology 
 RET proto-oncogene, a gene on human chromosome 10
 Resonance energy transfer, a mechanism describing energy transfer between two chromophores

Education 
 Research Experiences for Teachers, a program of the National Science Foundation
 Russell Education Trust, a Multi-Academy free school Trust

Other 
 Rational Emotive Therapy, therapy now referred to as rational emotive behavior therapy
 Rational Expectations Theory, economic model-consistent expectations
 Resistance exercise training, a type of physical exercise
 Reticulum, a constellation abbreviated Ret
 Reț, a village in Blăjeni Commune, Hunedoara County, Romania